is a former Japanese football player.

Playing career
Ozaki was born in Mie Prefecture on March 24, 1969. After graduating from high school, he joined Yamaha Motors (later Júbilo Iwata) in 1987. However he could hardly play in the match behind Shinichi Morishita until early 1990s and Tomoaki Ogami in late 1990s. From late 1999, he became a regular goalkeeper and the club won the champions in 1999 J1 League. However the club gained Arno van Zwam in June 2000 and Ozaki lost his regular position. In November 2000, he moved to Avispa Fukuoka. He battles with Nobuyuki Kojima and Hideki Tsukamoto for the position and he played in 10 matches. In 2002, he moved to Sanfrecce Hiroshima. However he could hardly play in the match behind Takashi Shimoda. He retired end of 2003 season.

Club statistics

References

External links

biglobe.ne.jp

1969 births
Living people
Association football people from Mie Prefecture
Japanese footballers
Japan Soccer League players
J1 League players
J2 League players
Japan Football League (1992–1998) players
Júbilo Iwata players
Avispa Fukuoka players
Sanfrecce Hiroshima players
Association football goalkeepers